The 1992–93 season of the WFA National League Premier Division was the second season of national top-flight league women's football in England. The competition was organised by the Women's Football Association.

Arsenal won their first women's National League title, two points ahead of the previous champions of 1991–92, Doncaster Belles.

The 2–1 win for Arsenal against Doncaster in March at Highbury was instrumental in securing the championship, reportedly only the second defeat of Doncaster Belles in a league game in 15 years. Naz Ball scored the winning goal. The game (part of an Arsenal fundraising day for Michael Watson) had 18,196 fans, the Women's National League/Premier League attendance record.

Arsenal also completed a Treble by defeating Doncaster Belles in the 1993 WFA Cup Final and then beating Knowsley United in the 1992–93 League Cup Final. Later, Arsenal repeated the domestic Treble in 2000–01 and 2006–07.

Premier Division
Final table:

See also
 1992–93 WFA Women's National League Cup
 UEFA Women's Euro 1993 qualifying

References

Eng
women
FA Women's National League seasons
1